The Southwest Virginia Governor's School for Science, Mathematics, and Technology is one of Virginia's 18 state-initiated magnet Governor's Schools.  It is a part-time school where 11th and 12th grade students take advanced classes in the morning (receiving their remaining classes from their home high school.)

The school utilizes the combined resources of the participating school divisions to provide programs which facilitate the acquisition of scientific and technical knowledge through laboratory investigation and research. Students attend the Governor's School for half a day to take science, math, and research classes before returning to their neighborhood high schools.  While all classes in the program satisfy high school requirements, they all count for college credit too.

The program's approach combines traditional classroom and laboratory training with specialized experiences such as visits from successful scientists and universities, unique internships, and various field research.

Faculty

Participating school systems
Carroll County
Floyd County
Galax City
Giles County
Montgomery County
Pulaski County
Radford City
Smyth County
Wythe County

Offered courses
College Chemistry
College Physics
Pre-Calculus
AP Statistics/Research
College Biology
University Physics
Applied Calculus
Engineering Calculus
Advanced Calculus
Vector Calculus
Differential Equations
Linear Algebra
Analytic Geometry
Introduction to Microcomputer Software
AP Environmental Science
Anatomy/Physiology
Organic Chemistry
Astronomy

References

External links
Southwest Virginia Governor's School

Public high schools in Virginia
Magnet schools in Virginia
NCSSS schools
Schools in Pulaski County, Virginia
Educational institutions established in 1990
1990 establishments in Virginia